is a Japanese anime television series directed by  and produced by Genco, Suplex, framegraphics and Geneon Entertainment for the 24-hour Japanese animation channel called Animax. The show pre-began as 14 eight-minute segment episodes which aired on Fuji Television's Flyer TV block from June 18, 1998 to September 24, 1998 from 24:45 to 24:55, with the animation being produced by Tokyo Kids. The full-length show, entitled , ran for 12 twenty-four-minute episodes which was aired on the 24-hour Japanese music channel called Space Shower TV from January 27, 2000 to April 13, 2000 at 19:00 and then 18:00.

The North American DVD release by A.D. Vision features two different English-dubbed versions: a straight translation of the original Japanese version (which was aired on Cartoon Network's Adult Swim block on November 7, 2004 with the original vintage episodes before making its official series premiere a week later) and an Americanized version with western pop culture references and short live-action skits featuring ADV voice cast members.

Summary
The show centers on the activities of Milk, a young 5-year-old superheroine who may or may not actually have any powers and usually can do very little besides making popular culture references. Its American slogan, as a result, became "Wholesome? Probably not. Good for you? Definitely." She lives in a house on a suspended platform with her malfunctioning robotic maid Tetsuko and her drunken pet slug Hanage (nosehair). The show follows a fairly linear formula. In each episode, the President (of "Everything", according to his name) calls with a new mission; whether Milk actually takes the mission is not guaranteed. Regardless of whether or not she takes the mission, she always takes credit and celebrates her success by going out for "sushi (or something)." Likewise, there are a number of other constants that follow through the series, often under contrived circumstances.

Major characters
 / 

The title character of the show, Milk is an infantile little girl whose status as a superhero is questionable. She is often selfish, vain, short-tempered, and has a habit of drooling, but is not devoid of decent qualities. She harbors a love-hate relationship with the President and Tetsuko, alternating between tormenting them and getting along with them. Although she works officially for the President, she chooses on her own whether or not she wants to follow his orders. Coincidentally, her house is in the shape of a baby bottle and she still drinks powdered milk from a baby bottle on occasion.

An obsolete robot maid, Tetsuko was created at the King's Idea Laboratory in 1982. She lives with and works for Milk. Tetsuko is a more conservative character, the only occasional voice of reason on the show when she is questioning Milk's greedy, questionable, or random decisions. She yearns for a stable traditional family life, which the living organisms around her do not even consider. Milk often calls her a piece of junk and Tetsuko is torn between loving Dr. Eyepatch (who may or may not be her "daddy") and being disappointed in him when he insults her or offers to replace her. She has the ability to generate a fart ("Tetsuko's gas") that is lethal enough to even kill a raging bear. The only character that brings out Tetsuko's aggressive side is Robodog, whom she hates. They are in a constant conflict over Milk's affection, much to Milk's amusement.

Hanage is Milk's green, middle-aged pet slug known as a "Hanage". He has a drinking problem and is incapable of speech, though he can understand multiple languages. When he does speak, it's usually to express his thoughts; often a maudlin soliloquy, that are referred to as "the voice of Hanage's heart." "Hanage" means "nose hair" in Japanese.

The President is a stout bald man who apparently runs the country Milk lives in (referred to only as "our nation", a subtle reference to the Japanese habit of referring to their country as such instead of using the proper names "Nihon" or "Nippon"). No one knows how he achieved his office. He assigns missions to Milk, but whether she takes them or not is her prerogative. The President proves to be inept and incapable at fulfilling his job, at one point firing his country's best missile (The Punishment Missile) on his own country at his own conclusion that his citizens would try to put him in the Guillotine or the electric chair. He has short, round arms and he frequently pounds on his desk when talking on the phone. The President likes wine, women, and song but he usually enjoys cheap wine, loose women, and off-key karaoke. He also attracts flies and dearly loves his pet cat, Kanchi. His desk is decorated with a different anime or pop culture character figure on every episode.

In each episode, he provides Milk with a new invention or gives information about topics of concern. Whether he created Tetsuko or not is never fully explained, but he always belittles her or offers to have her replaced. The eyepatch over Dr. Eyepatch's right eye changes its design every episode; sometimes it changes several times in the course of a single episode. He is seen only on a TV screen and he also once hosted the NG awards.

A purple-haired and white-skinned humanoid dressed in blue clothes and with a head shaped like a daikon radish. He is Milk's landlord. As Milk is perpetually over six months behind on her rent, he continually tries to get payment from her. However, whenever he tries to get the rent, she does or says something that shocks or tricks him, causing him to run back across the ladder to his own home. He is also anxious, as he once thought he lost his "purse," but shortly finds it after making a racket over it. The landlord is gay and this was disclosed in the Japanese version of episode 9, "Financial Decay Peninsula". His being gay is openly referred to in more than one episode.

A family of ants (a mother, a cuckolded father, and a baby larva) live underground near Milk's house. Their portion of the show chronicles their constant marital troubles. The family seems pretty neutral in the first three episodes, but things start to get tense afterwards. After noticing his wife's behavior and realizing that she is cheating, Yoshiki becomes more and more enraged, while Helen just denies it or changes the subject and talks to Ario. Eventually, Helen takes Ario and leaves. In the final episode of the show, Yoshiki writes a letter to his family and commits suicide.

Other characters
Haruo A robot that Tetsuko has a crush on. He only appears in the 1998 series.

The Counterfeiter A counterfeiter who (really) likes Belgian waffles. He makes counterfeit bills to buy a lot of them. In the Japanese version, the real currency has pictures of "Kin" while the counterfeit bills have pictures of "Gin" - a reference to the oldest-living twins. In the Americanized version, the bills are differentiated by pictures of Mary-Kate and Ashley Olsen.

The Colonel Presumably from the Navy, he and his assistant try in vain to get in contact with The President in trying to stop the Punishment Missile, but to no avail; The President is on the phone with Milk and quickly forgot about said missile. Quickly becoming a nervous wreck, The Colonel tries to get help from Dr. Eyepatch, only for the doctor to be absolutely unhelpful.

Kyuu the Myna Bird A bird that Tetsuko started keeping, but died the next week. It looks like a toucan. His favorite thing is "Chaushu" and his favorite kind of girl is bouncy. One episode later, he is revealed to have died right away, like most myna birds do.

A very cute cat wearing a red dress that runs away from the president finding him disgusting for being too clinging and Milk and the gang have to find her. She is found in a place called Meow Meow World. At first she refuses to return to the president and claims that she can get by with subsidized dating, but after Milk reads the president's letter, she is moved to tears and decides to return. She was first found by the president in a cardboard box on a rainy day.

Leonardo the Japanese Bear A violent bear from an Osaka bear farm. He defeats Robo Willy, but gets knocked out by Tetsuko's gas attack.

 A mentally disabled man dressed as a kindergarten student. He tries to get kids to play with him, but they can't because their parents said they couldn't. He gets shocked and throws a tantrum whenever they say he's not a kid. His name is a parody of Crayon Shin-chan.

Keizao Butae/Colonel Flanders The factory manager of the Gentucky Pork Legs Factory, who resembles Colonel Sanders. While hitting on an employee, he accidentally presses the laser control button, shutting down the power of the Pork Gun which allows Tonkichi & Tononko to escape. Keizao then hires a hitman to take them out.

Barazou A live-action cross-dressing man who appears frequently on the news. In the Americanized version, he is cut out and replaced by someone else.

 Akiko is heard but never seen. She is seemingly a young Japanese girl who does video art. Her "art" is never much more than a pretentious monologue read by her as she takes a video of normal things happening in Japan. The videos are live action and cut randomly into the show in various episodes.

Tonkichi & Tonko / Palmer & Penny Two pigs that are in love with each other. After escaping the Gentucky Pork Legs Factory, they defect to a country where people don't eat pork. As soon as they arrive, they are turned into pork legs by a hired hitman. Tonkichi may be a reference to the pig with the same name from the anime Hamtaro (though Hamtaro's English dub calls the pig Herbert)

King's Idea Laboratory Mechas

A rude, incontinent robot that Dr. Eyepatch made to help on some of Milk's missions. Tetsuko and he are bitter rivals. Robodog winds up causing a lot of conflict and trouble on Milk's missions.

Punishment Missile - A huge, red missile painted with a strange face that is fired at the selected target by the President in order to "punish" the target.
Submarine Milk 5 - A submarine that is used by Milk Chan to go underwater.
Rice Cake Maker No. 3 - A rice pounder that is toilet-like in shape. It pounds rice cakes over and over.
Dokochin 1 No. 4
Pork Gun No. 5/The Porkcinerator: A laser gun that is used to shoot pigs and sends their bodies into another dimension, except for their legs.
Mecha Elderly No. 7 ("Furby")/Geezerbot 1000: A robot that is designed to look like an old man. Fueled by ramen, he will suddenly become surly if he hasn't had any. He has no real function. This said to have debuted on The Tonight Show.
Bear Slayer Robo Willy No. 8/Willy the Bear Slaying Mecha A robot designed to slay bears unconditionally. On the mission, after one year of searching the bear, Leonardo, he gets destroyed easily by Leonardo the Japanese Bear.  His design vaguely resembles Jim Kelly's character in Enter the Dragon.
Magic Shiitake 1 No. 9/Magic Mushroom 5000: Magic Shiitake is a mushroom shaped device that warps time and space within a given radius so the user doesn't have to make an excuse to get out of whatever he doesn't want to do.

Theme songs
Original
Opening

Lyricist: Yu Aku / Composer: Takuro Yoshida / Singer: Haruka Nakamura

Ending

Lyricist: Yoshiyuki Tamiya / Composer: Yoshiyuki Tamiya / Performed by Yūichi Nagashima

Alternate
Opening
 "Disco Milk"

Episode list

Super Milk Chan

OH! Super Milk Chan

Milk's IT Revolution
A collection of flash shorts from the shockwave.jp website. This episode was only aired on Anime Network and was released on DVD in Japan. This collection includes shorts such as:
Everybody's a Picasso Here - A man by the name of Uotake Lupin the Third has been going around creating sculptures out of excrement and the President sends Milk to the care of the issue. The trio stops at King's Idea Laboratory, where they are given the Mecha No. 108 "Johnny" in order to construct a museum for Uotake Lupin to build his sculptures.
The Reform That Accompanies Milk's Pain - After seeing an advertisement about the latest King's Idea Laboratory Mecha No. 109 "Silicone Vision" (a mecha designed to detect if any person shown on television has had plastic surgery), Milk decides to purchase it. While enjoying their new device, the President informs Milk that a woman named Isabella Kaneko has taken her patron hostage and barricaded herself inside. While the report is shown on the news along with the woman's photo, the Silicone Vision detects that she has had plastic surgery done on her. Milk decides to report this information to the police, who in turn would use it to convince the woman to surrender.
Interactive According to Milk's Will - When an alien from Planet Kubota sends images of a man saying "I'm sorry, Dad" into peoples' heads, the President orders her to do something about it. The alien is arrested for his crimes. Later, while Milk and Tetsuko are eating sausages, the aliens decides to travel to earth, only to be arrested again.
Milk's Fight, Hoshino; Virtual Rain of Fists - While Milk and Tetsuko browse the internet and talk about pop culture, the President calls to report news about a watermelon thief.
Milk's Sense of Virtue as a Celebrity - The president calls to tell Milk that the sense of virtue in young women has been on the decline. To assist them on their mission, the gang head to the King's Idea Laboratory, where they are given Mecha No. 103 "Nadeshiko Panties", which are designed to stay attached onto underaged girls until they turn 18.
Milk's Sound of Rain is Lupin's Melody -

ADV Films story arcs
The multi-episode story arcs added to the Americanized English dub by ADV, involving the crew of said dub company in bizarre situations.

100% Whole
Marcy Bannor introduces the cast and crew of the Milk Chan dub; Tommy Drake dresses up in drag for a replaced scene.

Milk Shake
After a plasma TV is stolen from the break room, the ADV Films building has an automated lockdown drill. However, a blackout leaves everyone locked in separate rooms.

Cryin' Over Spilled Milk
Chris Borque loses the sound effects for episode 8, leading the cast to perform them themselves. Meanwhile, Marcy is given Ecstasy instead of Aspirin.

Milk & Kookies
The ADV cast and crew go to an anime convention, where Ben Pronsky is stalked by a fan.

TV segments
These are the shows that Milk Chan and friends watch:
Tama & Chuutaro/Mousey and Kitty
Mr. Deserted Island/Deserted Island
The Four Tire Brothers
Pastel Mr. Shin/Colorful Mr. Shin
Police of the North Star/Fist of South Star
Hirosue's Rush Into Poor People's Dinner
Company NOW/Dollars & Cents NOW
Technology Today!

Further reading

References

External links

Tokyo Kids Works listing 
Official Pierrot website 
Official ADV Films website 

Super Milk Chan at the Internet Movie Database

1998 anime television series debuts
1998 Japanese television series debuts
1998 Japanese television series endings
2000 anime television series debuts
2000 Japanese television series debuts
2000 Japanese television series endings
ADV Films
Animax original programming
Anime with original screenplays
Fuji TV original programming
Genco
NBCUniversal Entertainment Japan
Parody anime and manga
Pierrot (company)
Surreal comedy anime and manga
Wowow original programming
Animated television series about children